The 2008 Family Circle Cup was a women's tennis Tier I event on the 2008 WTA Tour, which took place from April 14 to April 20, 2008. The event was hosted at the Family Circle Tennis Center, in Charleston, South Carolina, United States and was the second event of the clay court season, played on green clay. The total prize money offered at this tournament was US$1,340,000.

Defending champion Jelena Janković led the field as the number one seed. Maria Sharapova, Anna Chakvetadze, Elena Dementieva and eventual champion Serena Williams joined her as the other four of five top ten players in the field. Other notable names that participated were 2007 Wimbledon finalist Marion Bartoli and Charleston standout Patty Schnyder, a two-time runner-up at this event.

Finals

Singles

 Serena Williams defeated  Vera Zvonareva, 6–4, 3–6, 6–3
It was Williams' 3rd title of the year and 31st of her career.

Doubles

 Katarina Srebotnik /  Ai Sugiyama defeated  Edina Gallovits /  Olga Govortsova, 6–2, 6–2

External links

 Official website
 ITF tournament edition details

Family Circle Cup
Charleston Open
Family Circle Cup
Family Circle Cup
Family Circle Cup